Justine L'Heureux (born March 1989) is a Canadian former long track speed skater.

L'Heureux represented her nation at international competitions. After competing at the 2005, 2006 and 2007 World Junior Speed Skating Championships, she finished in 2008 overall second. She made at elite level her ISU Speed Skating World Cup debut during the 2005–06 ISU Speed Skating World Cup season in the B-division. The later seasons she also competed sometimes in the A-division. She rode her last world cup race during the  2009–10 ISU Speed Skating World Cup season.

At the 2006 Canadian Single Distance Championships she won the bronze medal in the 3000 metres event.

Records

Personal records

References

1989 births
Place of birth missing (living people)
Date of birth missing (living people)
Canadian female speed skaters
Living people